The Saar Treaty, or Treaty of Luxembourg (German: Vertrag von Luxemburg, French: accords de Luxembourg) is an agreement between West Germany and France concerning the return of the Saar Protectorate to West Germany. The treaty was signed in Luxembourg on October 27, 1956, by foreign ministers Heinrich von Brentano of West Germany and Christian Pineau of France, following the Saar Statute referendum on October 23, 1955, which resulted in a majority vote against the Saar Statute.

After the Landtag declared to accede to the Federal Republic of Germany (West Germany), the incorporation of the Saarland was finalised on January 1, 1957. Both involved parties agreed on an economic transition period through 1959, during which the Saarland remained under French control.

References

External links 
 Saar Treaty 
 The Saar question on CVCE website 

Aftermath of World War II in Germany
History of Saarland
Aftermath of World War II in France
Treaties concluded in 1956
Treaties entered into force in 1957
1956 in Luxembourg
France–Germany relations
1956 in France
1956 in West Germany
Treaties involving territorial changes
October 1956 events in Europe